Shura Kandi (also Romanized as Shūrā Kandī and Shūrākandī; also known as Shiranshalio, Shīrvānshāhlū, and Shīrvān Shāhlū-ye ‘Olyā) is a village in Hasanlu Rural District, Mohammadyar District, Naqadeh County, West Azerbaijan Province, Iran. At the 2006 census, its population was 173, in 33 families.

References 

Populated places in Naqadeh County